Argalista is a genus of sea snails, marine gastropod mollusks in the family Colloniidae.

Distribution
These marine species are endemic to New Zealand, except Argalista kingensis, which occurs off Tasmania and Argalista rosea, which occurs off Victoria, Australia.

Species
Species within the genus Argalista include:
 Argalista corallina (Cotton & Godfrey, 1935)
 Argalista crassicostata (Murdoch, 1905)
 Argalista fluctuata (Hutton, 1883)
 Argalista fugitiva (Hedley, 1911)
 Argalista imperforata (Suter, 1908)
 Argalista kingensis May, 1923
 Argalista micans Powell, 1931
 Argalista nana Finlay, 1930
 Argalista rosea (Tenison Woods, 1876)
 Argalista roseopunctata  (Angas, 1880)
 Argalista rotella Powell, 1937
 Argalista umbilicata Powell, 1926
 Argalista variecostata Powell, 1937

References

 Iredale, T. 1915. A commentary on Suter's Manual of the New Zealand Mollusca. Transactions and Proceedings of the Royal Society of the New Zealand Institute. 47: 417-497

Colloniidae